Shibula is an ward in Ilemela District, Mwanza Region, Tanzania. In 2016 the Tanzania National Bureau of Statistics report there were 9,104 people in the ward.

References

Wards of Mwanza Region
Ilemela District
Constituencies of Tanzania